Turris andersoni is an extinct species of sea snail, a marine gastropod mollusk in the family Turridae, the turrids.

Description

Distribution
This extinct marine species was found in Eocene strata in California (55.8 to 48.6 Ma).

References

  R. E. Dickerson. 1913. Fauna of the Eocene at Marysville Buttes, California. University of California Publications Bulletin of the Department of Geology 7(12):257-298

andersoni
Gastropods described in 1913